Trap-A-Thon is the third studio album by American rapper Gucci Mane. It was released on October 11, 2007 through Big Cat Records with distribution via Tommy Boy Entertainment. Production was handled by Zaytoven, Cyber Sapp, G-Fresh, Slim Major, Reefa, Raw Beats and Low. The album features guest appearances from Big Tank, Black Magic, Young Snead, .45, Khia, Maceo and Yatta Mann.

Critical reception 
AllMusic stated that the album had "skull-rattling beats and rhymes spit with a knowing authority", and called it "another steady roller for fans of the Dirty South style".

Commercial performance
Trap-A-Thon debuted at number 69 on the US Billboard 200 chart, selling 12,000 copies in its first week.

Track listing

Charts

References

External links

2007 albums
Gucci Mane albums
Albums produced by Zaytoven